A World With No Skies is a debut album by American rapper Slaine. The album was originally scheduled for release on October 26, 2010, and copies were actually pressed and ready for distribution when Slaine and Surburban Noize chose to hold back and substantially rework the album due to sample clearance issues. To make up for the delay, Slaine released his mixtape The Devil Never Dies at the same time the album had been expected to hit shelves.

The original version of the album leaked after Nokia Digital accidentally released a digital version for sale on the planned October 26 release date. Therefore, the album was set to be released in February 2011 but was later pushed back again to an unknown date. Slaine later confirmed that the album will be released on August 16, 2011 and will be known as "A World with No Skies 2.0". Slaine has stated that roughly half of the tracks on the CD are the same as the original track list.

Three tracks from the original version were legitimately released in 2010: the first single, "99 Bottles" (which also appeared on the soundtrack for the movie The Town), "Mistaken Identity", which appeared on the La Coka Nostra mixtape The Audacity of Coke, and "Crillionaires", which circulated on the artists' Myspace pages.

Track listing

Original version

"2.0"

Charts

References

External links

2011 albums
Slaine (rapper) albums
Suburban Noize Records albums
Albums produced by DJ Lethal